Bioelectrochemistry is a bimonthly peer-reviewed scientific journal covering research on the electrochemistry of biological systems. The current editor-in-chief is E. Neumann (Bielefeld University). It was established in 1974 as Bioelectrochemistry and Bioenergetics and obtained its current title in 2000.

Impact factor
According to the Journal Citation Reports, the journal has a 2020 impact factor of 5.373.

References

External links 
 

Electrochemistry journals
Elsevier academic journals
Publications established in 1974
Bimonthly journals
English-language journals
Biophysics journals